"Gimme Your Love" is a song recorded as duet between American singers Aretha Franklin and James Brown in 1989. The two singers' only collaboration, it is the lead track on Franklin's album Through the Storm and also appeared on Brown's Soul Session Live. It was written by Narada Michael Walden and Jeffrey Cohen, and produced by the former. It was released as the album's third and final single on September 18, 1989, by Arista Records and peaked at No. 48 on the Billboard R&B singles chart. The song was poorly received by critics, with Rolling Stone describing it as "a series of whoops and grunts as challenging to [the singers] as yawning". Nevertheless, it was nominated for the 1990 Grammy Award for Best R&B Performance by a Duo or Group with Vocal.

Personnel
 Aretha Franklin – lead vocals, vocal engineer
 James Brown – lead vocals
 Kitty Beethoven – backing vocals
 Liz Jackson – backing vocals
 Skyler Jett – backing vocals
 Walter Afanasieff – keyboards, synth bass
 Marc Russo – saxophone solo
 Corrado Rustici – guitar
 Ren Klyce – Fairlight CMI programming
 "Bongo" Bob Smith – drum programming
 Narada Michael Walden – producer, arrangements, Simmons drums
 Lincoln Clapp – engineer
 David Frazer – engineer

References

1989 singles
1989 songs
Aretha Franklin songs
James Brown songs
Songs written by Narada Michael Walden
Songs written by Jeffrey E. Cohen
Arista Records singles
American dance-pop songs
Male–female vocal duets